Wisenta is a river of Thuringia and Saxony, Germany. It flows into the Saale near Eßbach.

See also
List of rivers of Thuringia
List of rivers of Saxony

Rivers of Thuringia
Rivers of Saxony
Rivers of Germany